Girish Soni Is an Indian politician of the Aam Aadmi Party and a former cabinet minister of SC & ST, Employment, Development and Labour of Delhi (28 December 2013 – 14 February 2014) under chief minister Arvind Kejriwal. He is currently a Member of the Delhi Legislative Assembly (MLA) from the Madipur constituency of Delhi, which he represents since 2013.

Personal life
Girish Soni was born on 3 December 1963 in Delhi. His father's name is Babu Lal Soni. Soni completed his 10th standard from Govt. Boys Senior Sec. School, Madipur; under the CBSE board of Delhi. He is educated till 12th standard and could not study further due to financial problems. He did a Refrigeration and Airconditioning diploma course with Industrial Training Institute (I. T. I.) Pusa, New Delhi in 1982. He is a manufacturer and Trader of leather goods and runs a small business under the name of M/S Mascot Leather Craft.

Soni is married to Mamta Soni (who is self-employed) and has two daughters and a son. He likes doing social service, reading and listening to old songs. His father is his inspiration in life.

Politics
Soni was a member of the Bharat Naujawan Sabha in the 1980s and was the general secretary of the party in Madipur assembly constituency.

Soni was part of Bijli Pani Andolan ("electricity water agitation") of the Aam Aadmi Party led by Arvind Kejriwal. It demanded cheap water and electricity for the people of Delhi.

Soni fought the assembly elections of December 2013 from Madipur, which was reserved for Scheduled caste. He polled 36,393 votes and won by a margin of 1,103 over Kailash Sankla of the Bharatiya Janata Party (BJP). He also defeated the three-time and sitting heavyweight MLA Mala Ram Gangwal of the Indian National Congress (INC),. He was appointed the cabinet minister of SC & ST, Employment, Development and Labour. Along with Rakhi Birla, he was one of the two Dalit ministers in Delhi cabinet under Chief Minister Arvind Kejriwal. At 49, he was the oldest minister in the cabinet. Soni was a minister for a short tenure of 49 days (28 December 2013 – 14 February 2014); the Kejriwal and his cabinet resigned.

The AAP renominated Soni as the Madipur candidate for the 2015 Delhi Legislative Assembly elections. He secured 66,571 votes and defeated BJP's Raj Kumar by a victory margin of 29,387 votes. The AAP won 67 of the 70 seats. However, Soni was kept out of the new cabinet under Kejriwal.

Member of Legislative Assembly (2020 - present)
Since 2020, he is an elected member of the 7th Delhi Assembly.

Committee assignments of Delhi Legislative Assembly
 Member (2022-2023), Public Accounts Committee

Electoral performance

References 

Living people
Delhi MLAs 2013–2015
Delhi MLAs 2015–2020
Delhi MLAs 2020–2025
Year of birth missing (living people)
Aam Aadmi Party MLAs from Delhi